The 2015 Nashville Venom season was the second and final season for the indoor football franchise, and their second in the Professional Indoor Football League (PIFL).

Schedule
Key:

Regular season
All start times are local to home team

Standings

Postseason

Roster

References

Nashville Venom
Nashville Venom
Nashville Venom